Berenika  Schmitz, stage name Berenika, (born January 24, 1983) is an American concert pianist. She attended Professional Children's School in New York as well as the Juilliard School of Music. Upon finishing high school she went to Harvard University where she was the recipient of the Leonard Bernstein Scholarship. She graduated magna cum laude in both Music and Government. She then pursued her master's degree at Christ Church, Oxford University and then her post-graduate diploma at the Royal Academy of Music, London.

She has performed worldwide with orchestras such as the Pittsburgh Symphony and Asheville Symphony, with the Toronto Symphony Orchestra under Jukka Pekka Saraste, the National Arts Centre Orchestra of Canada under Erich Kunzel, the Penderecki Festival Orchestra under Heinrich Schiff, the Boston Civic Symphony under Max Hobart in Jordan Hall, the Oxford Philomusica, the Winnipeg Symphony Orchestra, Santa Rosa Symphony, the RIC Symphony Orchestra, the New Philharmonic Orchestra, Florida, the Bialystock Philharmonic, Sinfonia Varsovia, Camerata New York, the Poznan Philharmonic, the Canadian Chamber Orchestra, the Christ Church Orchestra, the Beethoven Academy Orchestra and the Aspen Sinfonia. She toured South America as a soloist with the Youth Orchestra of the Americas performing in the major concert halls of Brazil, Panama, Peru, Uruguay, Costa Rica, and Argentina, including the Teatro Colón, Buenos Aires.

She has also performed in the Allen Room, Jazz at Lincoln Center and at the Wigmore Hall, London. She was the spokesperson for CASIO's Privia, and was the Leonard Bernstein Fellow at the Tanglewood Music Center. She has been presented to Queen Elizabeth II.

Her radio appearances include WQXR and Classic FM, MDR Germany, the BBC, NPR and the CBC.

Berenika made a critically acclaimed live recording of the Beethoven Piano Concerto No. 3 with Sinfonietta Cracovia under John Axelrod, distributed by Universal Music Group.

She has been photographed by famous celebrity photographer Douglas Kirkland and dressed in American designer Halston.

A child prodigy, she performed as soloist with the Sault Symphony Orchestra at the age of 9.

References

Canadian classical pianists
Canadian women pianists
Alumni of the Royal Academy of Music
Juilliard School alumni
Living people
1983 births
Harvard College alumni
Alumni of Christ Church, Oxford
21st-century classical pianists
Women classical pianists
21st-century women pianists